The 1976 Mason-Dixon 500 was a NASCAR Winston Cup Series event that took place on May 16, 1976, at Dover Downs International Speedway (now called Dover International Speedway) in Dover, Delaware.

Only manual transmission vehicles were allowed to participate in this race; a policy that NASCAR has retained to the present day.

Background

Dower Downs International Speedway, now called Dover International Speedway, is one of  five short tracks to hold NASCAR races; the others are Bristol Motor Speedway, Richmond International Raceway, Martinsville Speedway, and Phoenix International Raceway. The track's turns are banked at twenty-four degrees, and both the front stretch (the location of the finish line) and the backstretch are banked at nine degrees.

Race report
The total time of the race was four hours, nineteen minutes, and fifty-three seconds. Six cautions were given for thirty-eight laps while thirty-two thousand and eight hundred fans were in attendance for the race. From lap 115 to lap 227, Cale Yarborough would get into a run of good luck and lead for a duration of 163 laps. He would never regain the lead after losing it to David Pearson on lap 278.

Benny Parsons defeated second place driver David Pearson by a time of 25½ seconds. Other notable racers who competed includes: Darrell Waltrip, Ricky Rudd, and Cale Yarborough (who would lose the points lead after this race). Bruce Hill finished in last place due to an engine problem on lap 2.

This race would be Neil Castles' final race in his NASCAR Cup Series career. It would also be the last race for Doc Faustina before his retirement. Total winnings for this race would be $108,140 ($ when adjusted for inflation).

Qualifying

Top 10 finishers

Timeline
Section reference: 
 Start of race: Bobby Allison had the pole position as the green flag waves into the air.
 Lap 2: Bruce Hill's engine stopped working properly on this lap.
 Lap 3: David Pearson took over the lead from Bobby Allison.
 Lap 16: Cale Yarborough took over the lead from David Pearson.
 Lap 23: Benny Parsons took over the lead from Cale Yarborough.
 Lap 34: Cale Yarborough took over the lead from Benny Parsons.
 Lap 51: Tommy Gale had a terminal crash.
 Lap 57: Dave Marcis took over the lead from Cale Yarborough.
 Lap 58: David Pearson took over the lead from Dave Marcis.
 Lap 59: Benny Parsons took over the lead from David Pearson.
 Lap 63: Cale Yarborough took over the lead from Benny Parsons.
 Lap 113: Dave Marcis took over the lead from Cale Yarborough.
 Lap 115: Cale Yarborough took over the lead from Dave Marcis.
 Lap 136: Cecil Gordon's vehicle suffered from engine problems.
 Lap 149: Transmission problems would force Donnie Allison to quit the race prematurely.
 Lap 218: Engine problems struck Ed Negre in a manner that he could not continue the race.
 Lap 247: Ricky Rudd had a terminal crash.
 Lap 250: Ignition problems ended Earl Brooks' chance of winning the race.
 Lap 271: Engine problems forced Buddy Arrington to step aside.
 Lap 278: David Pearson took over the lead from Cale Yarborough.
 Lap 316: Engine problems managed to bring Darrell Waltrip into the garage for the remainder of the race.
 Lap 320: A faulty swar bar took away Buck Baker's hopes at a respectable race finish.
 Lap 326: Dave Marcis took over the lead from David Pearson.
 Lap 327: David Pearson took over the lead from Dave Marcis.
 Lap 332: Benny Parsons took over the lead from David Pearson.
 Lap 354: David Pearson took over the lead from Benny Parsons.
 Lap 362: Benny Parsons took over the lead from David Pearson.
 Finish: Benny Parsons was officially declared the winner of the event.

Standings after the race

References

Mason-Dixon 500
Mason-Dixon 500
Mason-Dixon 500
NASCAR races at Dover Motor Speedway